Andrew P. Kealy was a member of the Wisconsin State Assembly.

Biography
Kealy was born on January 29, 1861, in Pittsburgh, Pennsylvania. He moved with his parents to Pleasant Valley, St. Croix County, Wisconsin, in 1870. In 1891, he bought a farm in Hammond (town), Wisconsin. Kealy died in 1917.

Political career
Kealy was elected to the assembly in 1910. Additionally, he was a supervisor of Pleasant Valley, chairman of the board of supervisors of Hammond, chairman of the county board and Sheriff of St. Croix County, Wisconsin, and mayor of Hudson, Wisconsin. In 1912, Kealy was a candidate for Secretary of State of Wisconsin. He lost to John Donald. Kealy was a Democrat.

References

Politicians from Pittsburgh
People from Hudson, Wisconsin
Democratic Party members of the Wisconsin State Assembly
Mayors of places in Wisconsin
Wisconsin sheriffs
Farmers from Wisconsin
1861 births
1917 deaths